Samuel Coleridge-Taylor (1875–1912) was an English composer and conductor.

Coleridge-Taylor may also refer to:
 Coleridge-Taylor Elementary School, a public school in Louisville, Kentucky

People with the name
Avril Coleridge-Taylor, (1903–1998), English pianist, conductor, and composer, daughter of Samuel
Coleridge-Taylor Perkinson (1932–2004), American composer

See also
Samuel Taylor Coleridge (1772–1834), English poet, literary critic, philosopher and theologian